This is a list of etymological lists.

General
 List of company name etymologies
 List of computer term etymologies
 List of band name etymologies
 List of chemical element name etymologies

English word origins

 Non-loanwords
 Proto-Indo-European — Proto-Germanic — Anglo-Saxon 
 How words have been loaned from various languages to (many) other languages:
 Australian Aboriginal — African — Afrikaans — Algonquian — Arabic — Bengali — Chinese — Czech — Dutch — Etruscan — French — German — Greek — Hawaiian — Hebrew — Hindi — Hungarian — Irish — Italian — Japanese — Korean — Latin — Malay — Malayalam — Maori — Nahuatl — Norwegian — Old Norse — Persian — Polish — Portuguese — Punjabi — Quechua — Russian — Sanskrit — Scots — Scottish Gaelic — Spanish — Swedish — Tamil — Turkic — Ukrainian —Urdu — Yiddish
 Lists of foreign words with English derivatives
Greek — Latin

See: Medical terminology

Spanish word origins
African — 
Americas — 
Arabic —  
Austronesian — 
Basque/Iberian — 
Celtic — 
Chinese — 
Etruscan — 
French — 
Germanic —
Greek — 
Indo-Aryan —
Iranian — 
Italic —  
Latin —  
Semitic —  
Turkic — 
uncertain —
various

Romanian word origins
Dacian

Toponymy or placename etymology

 List of country-name etymologies
 British — UK counties — German — India — Irish — Romanian counties — Bulgarian provinces — Brazilian States — U.S. States — Filipino Provinces
 List of etymologies of country subdivision names
 List of national capital city name etymologies
 List of river name etymologies
 List of Australian place names of Aboriginal origin
 List of place names in Canada of aboriginal origin
 List of indigenous names of Eastern Caribbean islands
 Origins of names of cities and towns in Hong Kong
 Lists of North American place name etymologies
 List of place names of French origin in the United States
 List of place names of Spanish origin in the United States
 List of place names in the United States of Native American origin
 List of Chinook Jargon placenames
 Sri Lankan place name etymology

Toponyms or names derived from places
 List of words derived from toponyms
 Chemical elements named after places
 List of inventions named after places
 Maghreb toponymy

Eponyms (names derived from people)

 Astronomical objects named after people
 Cartoon characters named after people
 Chemical elements named after people
 Colleges and universities named after people
 Companies named after people
 Countries named after people
 Diseases named after people
 English adjectives named after people
 Foods named after people
 Human anatomical parts named after people
 Ideologies named after people
 Inventions named after people
 Minerals named after people
 Places and political entities named after people
 Prizes named after people
 Scientific constants named after people
 Scientific laws named after people
 Scientific phenomena named after people
 Scientific units named after people
 Sports terms named after people

Names derived from animals and animal eponyms
 List of fish named after animals
 List of places named after animals
 List of minor planets named after animals and plants

External links
 List of etymologies of words